Teen Lust (also known as The Girls Next Door and Mom Never Told Me in the United States, and released as Police Girls Academy in the United Kingdom) is a 1979 American sexploitation comedy film directed by actor James Hong.

Premise
Two sexy young women move into a sleepy suburb and before long, every man in the vicinity falls for their charms.

References

External links 

1979 films
1970s sex comedy films
American sex comedy films
1970s English-language films
Films set in the 1970s
American teen comedy films
Teen sex comedy films
1979 comedy films
1970s American films